"Feels So Good" is a song by Dutch disc jockey and producer Armin van Buuren. It features vocals from American singer and songwriter Nadia Ali. It was released on 20 June 2011 in the Netherlands by Armind as the fifth single from van Buuren's fourth studio album, Mirage.

Music video 
A music video to accompany the track was released to Armada Music's YouTube channel on 20 June 2011. It was shot in Hotel Des Indes, The Hague. It shows Armin van Buuren and Nadia Ali spying each other in the hotel.

Track listing 
Netherlands / US - Digital download - Armind 
 "Feels So Good" (Radio Edit) – 3:09
 "Feels So Good" (Tristan Garner Remix) – 6:10
 "Feels So Good" (Jochen Miller Remix) - 6:31
 "Feels So Good" (Jerome Isma-ae Remix) - 7:16
 "Feels So Good" (Armin van Buuren Club Mix) - 6:26

Netherlands - 12" - Armind 
 "Feels So Good" (Tristan Garner Remix) – 6:10
 "Feels So Good" (Jochen Miller Remix) – 6:31
 "Feels So Good" (Jerome Isma-ae Remix) – 7:16
 "Feels So Good" (Armin van Buuren Club Mix) – 6:26

Charts

References 

2011 songs
2011 singles
Armin van Buuren songs
Nadia Ali (singer) songs
Songs written by Armin van Buuren
Songs written by Benno de Goeij
Songs written by Miriam Nervo
Songs written by Olivia Nervo
Armada Music singles